Ranrahirca was a village in Peru, alongside the river Santa, near Huascarán, the highest mountain in Peru. It was hit by massive avalanches of snow, rocks and mud, originating on the slopes of Huascarán and triggered by earthquakes on 10 January 1962 and on 31 May 1970. Over two thousand people from the village perished in the 1962 avalanche, along with the inhabitants of seven nearby settlements. In total about 3,500 died in the disaster. About 20,000 people died in the avalanches that resulted from the second earthquake (known as the 1970 Ancash earthquake).400 survived from the second disaster.

See also
 Yungay, Peru

References

BBC News "On this day" website
Time magazine article

External links
Earthquake of 31 May 1970
  Earthquake 31 May 1970 (chimboteonline)
  Earthquake 31 May 1970 (yungayperu.com, with details and fotos of the catastrophe)

Populated places in the Ancash Region
Destroyed cities
Landslides in Peru
Landslides in 1962 
Landslides in 1970
1962 disasters in Peru 
1970 disasters in Peru
January 1962 events in South America
May 1970 events in South America